The 2016–17 Alabama A&M Bulldogs basketball team represented Alabama A&M University during the 2016–17 NCAA Division I men's basketball season. The Bulldogs, led by sixth-year head coach Willie Hayes, played their home games at the Elmore Gymnasium in Normal, Alabama and were members of the Southwestern Athletic Conference. They finished the season 2–27, 2–16 in SWAC play to finish in last place. They did not qualify for the SWAC tournament.

On March 7, head coach Willie Hayes resigned. He finished at Alabama A&M with a six year record of 54–121. On April 12, the school named Texas Southern assistant and former Florida International head coach Donnie Marsh the new head coach.

Previous season
The Bulldogs finished the 2015–16 season 11–18, 6–12 record in SWAC play to finish in a three-way tie for seventh place. They beat Arkansas–Pine Bluff in the first round of the SWAC tournament before losing to Texas Southern in the quarterfinals.

Roster

Schedule and results

|-
!colspan=9 style=| Non-conference regular season

|-
!colspan=9 style=| SWAC regular season

References

Alabama A&M Bulldogs basketball seasons
Alabama AandM